The Summer Isles are an archipelago lying in the mouth of Loch Broom, in the Highland region of Scotland.

Geography
Tanera Mòr is the largest island and was the last one to remain inhabited. It was formerly home to an Atlantic salmon fish farm, some rental holiday homes, a café and a post office, which operated its own local post and printed its own stamps since 1970 until 2013, but a new set is planned for 2016. The island has no roads, and the only recognisable path goes around the Anchorage, the sheltered bay on the east side of the island. Boats sail to the island from Achiltibuie and Ullapool.

Other islands

 Bò Bhùiridh
 Bottle Island
 Càrn Deas
 Càrn Iar
 Càrn nan Sgeir
 Eilean a' Chàr
 Eilean Choinaid
 Eilean Dubh
 Eilean Fada Beag
 Eilean Fada Mòr
 Eilean Mullagrach
 Eilean na Saille
 Glas-leac Beag
 Glas-leac Mòr
 Horse Island
 Iolla Mhòr
 Isle Martin
 Isle Ristol
 Meall nan Caorach
 Meall nan Gabhar
 Priest Island (Eilean a' Chlèirich)
 Sgeir an Aon Iomairt
 Sgeir Bhuidhe Mòr
 Sgeir Loisgte
 Sgeir nam Mult
 Sgeir Ribhinn
 Sgeirean Glasa
 Stac Mhic Aonghais
 Tanera Beag

Conservation
The islands are part of the Assynt-Coigach National Scenic Area, one of 40 in Scotland.

Frank Fraser Darling, an important figure in the development of Scottish conservation, lived on Tanera Mòr for two years in the 1930s. His book, Island Years (published 1940), records his time in the Summer Isles, painting Priest Island as a place of great beauty as well as great wildlife.

Literature, film, and music
The Summer Isles feature in a novella of the same name by Ian R. MacLeod.
The fictional Summer Isle, Cladach Duillich (Sad Shore), features in the 1977 Desmond Bagley novel The Enemy.
The third movement of a guitar suite, "The Great Western Road," on the album of the same name by Tim Slemmons, is entitled, "III. Evening in the Summer Isles."
 The Children's Film Foundation (CFF) The Big Catch (1968) features a group of boys who plan to sail to The Summer Isles to capture a wild pony. Filming took place in and around Ullapool and Lochinver.
The pagan island of "Summerisle" featured in the motion picture The Wicker Man (filmed in 1973 & directed by Robin Hardy) is sometimes mistakenly associated with this archipelago, but in actuality The Wicker Man was filmed around Newton Stewart in Dumfries and Galloway.

Summer Isles Philatelic Bureau
Since 1970 the Summer Isles Philatelic Bureau has been issuing stamps of the islands for tourists who place them on mail to be carried to the nearest GPO Post Box on the mainland.

Culture
The musician Mairearad Green grew up in Achiltibuie on the Coigach peninsula, overlooking the Summer Isles.  She has released an album entitled Summer Isles.

See also

 List of islands of Scotland

References

External links
 Panorama of the Summer Isles (QuickTime required)

 
Ross and Cromarty
Archipelagoes of Scotland
Islands of Highland (council area)
Underwater diving sites in Scotland